John Payn may refer to:

John Payn (MP for Cambridge), in 1391 MP for Cambridge
John Payn (died 1402), MP for Norfolk

See also
John Payne (disambiguation)
John Paine (disambiguation)